The 1991 1. divisjon, Norway's second-tier football league, began play on 28 April 1991 and ended on 6 October 1991. The league was contested by 24 teams, divided in two groups and the winner of each group won promotion to Tippeligaen, while the runners-up played a promotion-playoff against the 10th placed team in the 1991 Tippeligaen. The bottom three teams were relegated to the 2. divisjon.

Mjøndalen and Ham-Kam won promotion to Tippeligaen, while Kristiansund, Frigg, Surnadal, Mjølner, Råde and Sandefjord was relegated to the 2. divisjon.

Tables

Group A

Group B

Promotion play-offs

Results 
 Strindheim – Bryne 0–2
 Brann – Strindheim 1–0
 Bryne – Brann 0–1

Brann won the qualification round and was promoted to the 1992 Tippeligaen.

Play-off table

Top scorers Group B

See also 
 1991 Tippeligaen
 1991 2. divisjon

References 

Norwegian First Division seasons
2
Norway
Norway